is a Japanese voice actress and a former member of the Japanese idol girl group AKB48. In AKB48, she was originally a fourth generation trainee, then in Team A, in Team B, and finally in Team K. Amina Sato was also a member of a pop group named No Name, which consisted of several AKB48 members voice acting in the animation series AKB0048.

Career

AKB48 
Sato joined the Japanese idol group AKB48 as a 4th generation trainee. In April 2008 she was promoted to Team A. In the first AKB48 general election in 2009, she placed eighth overall and was part of the group's A-side single.

On  August 23, 2009, at an AKB48 concert it was announced that in October she would be transferred from Team A to Team B. The transfer finally came into effect on May 21, 2010.

In summer 2010 she placed 18th in the second general election, earning a place on the A-side of AKB48's 17th single "Heavy Rotation". In the third general election in 2011, she placed 18th, winning a spot on the A-side for the single "Flying Get".

In December 2011 she passed an audition to voice act in AKB48's animated TV series AKB0048. Broadcast from April 2012, it featured her voice as one of the main characters Yūka Ichijō. She also participated in the two singles released by the associated pop unit No Name, composed of AKB48 members who were voice acting in the anime series. She reprised the role of Yuka in AKB0048'''s second season.

In 2012, she placed 21st in AKB48's fourth general election, and performed on the B-side track "Nante Bohemian" as part of Under Girls for the single "Gingham Check". In 2013, she placed 33rd on the fifth general election. The election rank made her the choreography center of the group Next Girls (formed of those who placed 33 to 48) which performed a B-side track for the single "Koi Suru Fortune Cookie".

On November 1, 2012, as part of a mass group shuffle announced on August 24 (on the first day of the AKB48 Tokyo Dome concert series), she was transferred from AKB48's Team B to Team K.組閣後新体制 - AKB48オフィシャルブログ 2012年8月24日

On December 22, 2013, at an AKB48 Team K's stage performance in Tokyo, Sato announced her graduation from AKB48. In her statement she expressed her intention to pursue her dream of becoming a voice actress. She graduated at a performance in the AKB48 Theater on January 15, 2014.

 Post-AKB48 

In July 2016 Sato released a single as Arisu Tachibana, the character she voices in The Idolmaster anime series. The single reached number 8 on the Japanese Oricon Singles Chart.

In December 2016 it was announced that Sato would lend her voice to a new character that was being added to anime Girlish Number, a 17-year-old girl named Nanami Sakuragaoka.

 Discography 

 Solo singles 

 Singles and other songs with AKB48
Songs on AKB48 singles
A-sides
"Iiwake Maybe"
"Heavy Rotation"
"Flying Get"

B-sides
"Kimi no Koto ga Suki Dakara"
"Nusumareta Kuchibiru"
"Nakeru Basho"
"Love Jump"
"Area K"
"Hito no Chikara"
"Gondola Lift"
"Yobisute Fantasy"
"Hitsujikai no Tabi"
"Mitsu no Namida"
"Nante Bohemian"
"Scrap & Build"
"Yūhi Marie"
"How Come?"
"Kondo Koso Ecstasy"

Original songs on AKB48 albums
"Ningyo no Vacances" (on the album Koko ni Ita Koto)

 Appearances 
 See 佐藤亜美菜#出演 in the Japanese Wikipedia.

TV dramas 
 Majisuka Gakuen (2010)
 Sakura Kara no Tegami (2011)
 Majisuka Gakuen 2 (2011)

Stage plays 
 Dump Show! (2011)
 SEMPO (ja) (musical, 2013)
  (original musical, on stage since 26 July 2014)

Radio shows 
 AKB48 no All Night Nippon

Voice acting

Anime 
 AKB0048 (2012) — Yūka Ichijō (main)
 AKB0048: Next Stage (2013) — Yūka Ichijō (main)
 Jewelpet: Magical Change — Nene (supporting)
 Morita-san wa Mukuchi — girl with glasses (supporting)
 Kids on the Slope — Mariko (supporting)
 The Idolmaster Cinderella Girls 2nd Season — Arisu Tachibana (supporting)
 The Idolmaster Cinderella Girls: Anytime, Anywhere with Cinderella — Arisu Tachibana (supporting)
 Triage X — Oriha Nashida (main)
 Triage X: Recollection XOXO — Oriha Nashida (supporting)
 Girlish Number — Nanami Sakuragaoka (supporting)
 Bermuda Triangle: Colorful Pastrale  — Natura (supporting)
 Gekidol  — Mayuri Nakamura (supporting)

Video games 
 The Idolmaster Cinderella Girls — Arisu Tachibana
 Counter:Side — Lycoris

Dubbing

Live-action 
 Clifford the Big Red Dog – Isabelle
 A Series of Unfortunate Events – Carmelita Spats

Animation 
 Johnny Test - Mary Test

References

External links 

 Official agency profile 
 
 

1990 births
Living people
Actresses from Tokyo
Japanese television personalities
Japanese video game actresses
Japanese voice actresses
Japanese idols
AKB48 members